Harry Young was an English professional rugby league footballer who played in the 1910s and 1920s.

Playing career

International honours
Harry Young won a cap for England while at Widnes, he played , i.e. number 5, and scored a try in the 27-22 victory over Wales at Workington on Saturday 7 February 1925.

County League appearances
Harry Young played in Widnes' victory in the Lancashire County League during the 1919-20 season.

Club career
Harry Young made his début for Widnes during the 1916-17 season, and he played his last match for Widnes during the 1925-26 season.

Note
Harry Young and the similarly named Harold Young had overlapping playing careers at Bradford Northern, and consequently some references incorrectly merge their details.

References

External links
Search for "Harry Young" at britishnewspaperarchive.co.uk

Bradford Bulls players
England national rugby league team players
English rugby league players
Place of birth missing
Place of death missing
Rugby league wingers
Widnes Vikings players
Year of birth missing
Year of death missing